Steven J. Zaloga (born February 1, 1952) is an American author and defense consultant. He received a bachelor's degree cum laude at Union College and a master's degree at Columbia University, both  in history.

He has published many books dealing with modern military technology, and especially Soviet and CIS tanks and armoured warfare. He is a senior analyst at the Teal Group.

He is also a noted scale armor modeler and is a host/moderator of the World War II Allied Discussion group at Missing-Lynx.com, a modelling website. He is a frequent contributor to the UK-based modeling magazine Military Modelling. He is a member of the Armor Modeling and Preservation Society.

Works

See also
 David Doyle – American writer on historic military vehicles, hardware, aircraft and warships

References

Further reading

 
 
  Gale Biography In Context.

External links
 

1952 births
Columbia Graduate School of Arts and Sciences alumni
Living people
Union College (New York) alumni
Writers from Pittsfield, Massachusetts
Jagiellonian University alumni
People from Abingdon, Maryland
American military historians
American male non-fiction writers
Historians of armoured warfare
Historians from Massachusetts
Historians from New York (state)
Historians from Maryland
Historians of weapons